Shrink may refer to:

Common meanings
Miniaturization
Shrink, a slang term for:
 a psychiatrist
 a psychoanalyst
 a psychologist

Arts, entertainment, and media
Shrink (album), album by German indie rock/electronica group The Notwist
Shrink (film), independent drama film starring Kevin Spacey
Shrink, also known as Experiment 001, a fictional genetic experiment from the Lilo & Stitch franchise
Shrink (Slade), sixth book in the Special X series by Michael Slade, also known as Primal Scream
Shrink (TV series), an American comedy series
Shrinks (TV series), a British drama series
Shrink, a Yu-Gi-Oh! card, printed in the TCG as a Shonen Jump Championship promo

Other uses
Resizing (fiction), or shrink

See also

 
Shrinking (TV series), an American comedy series
Shrinkage (disambiguation)
Psych (disambiguation)